Hong Kong participated at the 16th Asian Games in Guangzhou, China.

Medal summary

Medal table

Medalists

Athletics

Men 

Track events

Field events

Road events

Women 
Track events

Badminton

Men

Women

Mixed

Baseball

Men
Team
Au Colina Gabriel ChihoAu Wing LeungChan Chun WahChan Kei WaChau Chun Shing DuncanChiu Chi Kam KennethChiu Yan Nok EnroyChu Ho YuenIp Kam Tao ColinLeung Ho NamLeung Yu ChungLi Wing SingNau Ching NamNg Yuk MingTang Shu NinTsang Kai KongTsang Kin ChungWu Chun YeungWu Tsz FungWu Tsz FungYeung Kun HinYung Tsun Wai

Pool B

Basketball

Men
Team
Chan Yik LunCheung Wai HongChow Ka KuiChow Kin WanFong Shing YeeHeung Chun Keung MikeLau Hoi ToLiang Man HungPoon Chi HoSzeto Wai KitTsoi Lung TakWong Chun Wai

In the qualifying round, Hong Kong lose to DPR Korea 71–78

Beach volleyball

Men

Women

Board games

Weiqi

Xiangqi

Bowling

Men

All events

Masters

Women

All events

Canoeing

Canoe-Kayak Slalom 
Men

Cricket

Men
In men, Hong Kong team is in group B and the competitors are Nepal and Maldives.

Team
Irfan AhmedNadeem AhmedZafaran AliNajeeb AmarJames AtkinsonWaqas BarkattIlyas GulAizaz KhanAsif KhanRoy LamsamNicholas LauKaiming LiAli-NiazFarooq SaeedShakeel

Group round

 Best 4 teams (three of the four ICC Full Members in Asia, Bangladesh, Pakistan and Sri Lanka as well as Afghanistan who played in the 2010 ICC World Twenty20) directly entered the quarterfinals.

Pool C

Quarterfinals

Women
In woman, Hong Kong team will meet Bangladesh and Nepal in pool B.

Team
Mariko HillKa Man ChanWun Ting CheungYasmin DaswaniIshitaa GidwaniKeenu GillHung Ying HoManpreet KaurKai Ling LiDominique McCuskerAlvina TamConnie WongKristine WongSze Wan Yip

Group round

Pool A

Cue Sports

Cycling

BMX 
Men

Mountain Bike 
Men

Road 

Men

Women

Track 
Sprints

Pursuits

Keirin

Time Trial

Points races

Dance Sports

Latin

Diving

Men

Dragon boat

Men

Equestrian

Dressage

Eventing

Jumping

Fencing

Men

Women

Football

Team
Au Yeung Yiu ChungChak Ting HungChan Man FaiChan Siu YuenChan Wai HoChao PengfeiJu Ying ZhiKwok Kin PongLai Man FeiLai Yiu CheongLam Hok HeiLee Chi HoLeung Hing KitLo Kwan YeePak Wing ChakSo Wai ChuenTsang Kam ToXu DeshuaiYapp Hung FaiYuen Kin Man

Pool matches

Group E

1/8 finals

Golf

Men

Women

Gymnastics

Artistic gymnastics 
Men
Individual Qualification & Team all-around Final

Individual

Women
Individual Qualification & Team all-around Final

Individual

Handball 

Team
Chan Wan ManCheng Chun WingHo Wai KitHui Man PongIp Kwun Ying AddyIp Shi YanJia DongjinKoon Lap KeiLeung Chi SaiLeung Hoi YipLin Ming FaiNg Yue KiuTse Wai HeiWong Ka YuWong Shing YipYiu Tai Wai

Preliminary round

In men, Hong Kong team is in group B. Its competitors are South Korea, Iran, Bahrain and Bahrain.

 Placement 9th–10th

Hockey

Team
Akbar AliAli AsifArifaliAshgar AliBal Harinder SinghChan Ka HoChhina Jasbir SinghDillon Aman SinghDillon Dev SinghInderpal SinghLeung Hong Wang HowardMohammed MustafaMohammed SwalikhRashid Mehmood RajaKieran Thomas Sturrock SmithZakir Muhammad Noman

Preliminary

In men, Hong Kong team is in pool B.

Ninth and tenth place

Judo

Men

Karate

Men

Women

Rowing

Men

Women

Rugby Union

Men
Team
Simon LeungKwok Ka ChunMark WrightAnthony HaynesTsang Hing HungJamie HoodFan Shun KeiEdward HaynesRowan VartyKeith RobertsonSebastian PerkinsYiu Kam Shing

In men, Hong Kong is in pool A.
{| class="wikitable" style="text-align: center;"
|-
!width="200"|Team
!width="40"|Pld
!width="40"|W
!width="40"|D
!width="40"|L
!width="40"|PF
!width="40"|PA
!width="40"|+/-
!width="40"|Pts
|-  bgcolor="#ccffcc"
|align=left| 
|4||4||0||0||136||12||+124||12
|-  bgcolor="#ccffcc"
|align=left| 
|4||3||0||1||128||39||+89||10
|-  bgcolor="#ccffcc"
|align=left| 
|4||2||0||2||68||76||−8||8
|-  bgcolor="#ccffcc"
|align=left| 
|4||1||0||3||76||86||−10||6
|-
|align=left| 
|4||0||0||4||0||195||−195||4
|}

Quarterfinals

Semifinals

Final

Final standing
{| class="wikitable" style="text-align: center;"
!width=40|Rank
!width=180|Team
|-
| 
| align="left"|
|}

Women
Team
Chan Ho TingChan Ho TingChan Leong SzeCheng Ka ChiCheng Tsz TingStephanie CuvelierLai Pou FanLau Sin TungPoon Pak YanSamantha ScottSham Wai SumLindsay Varty

In woman, Hong Kong is in pool A.
{| class="wikitable" style="text-align: center;"
|-
!width="200"|Team
!width="40"|Pld
!width="40"|W
!width="40"|D
!width="40"|L
!width="40"|PF
!width="40"|PA
!width="40"|+/-
!width="40"|Pts
|- 
|align=left| 
|3||3||0||0||116||0||+116||9
|-
|align=left| 
|3||2||0||1||65||50||+15||7
|-
|align=left| 
|3||1||0||2||50||46||−4||5
|-
|align=left| 
|3||0||0||3||0||135||−135||3
|}

Quarterfinals

Semifinals

Bronze medal match

Final standing
{| class="wikitable" style="text-align: center;"
!width=40|Rank
!width=180|Team
|-
| 4
| align="left"|
|}

Sailing

Men

Women

Open

Shooting

Men

Women

Squash

Swimming

Men

Women

Table Tennis

Taekwondo

Men

Tennis

Triathlon

Volleyball

Men

Team
Chan Chi WaiChan Kam YinCheng Chun ManChung Wai WingFok Shu WingHui Pui TakKeung Chun KeungKo Yiu HungKwok Chung KanKwong Ngai ShingWong Ka WaiYu Hing Lung

Preliminary

In boys' team, Hong Kong is in group D.

Group D

|}

|}

Water polo

Men

Team
Chan Sze HoKelvin ChengCheng Ka LongCheung Hok HimMichael CheungChung Kwok LeungFong Ho CheungKoo Yu FatKu Yat WaLee Kwan ShingPo Yue KaiToby ToZhao Jinwen

Preliminary

Group A
In men's tournament, Hong Kong team is in group A.

Quarterfinals

Classification 5th–8th

7th place match

Weightlifting

Wushu

Men
Changquan

Nanquan\Nangun

Taijiquan\Taijijian

Daoshu\Gunshu

Sanshou

Women
Changquan

Nanquan\Nangun

Jianshu\Qiangshu

References

Nations at the 2010 Asian Games
2010
Asian Games